Mann is a 1999 Indian Hindi-language romantic drama film written and directed by Indra Kumar. The film starred Aamir Khan and Manisha Koirala, pairing them for the second time, and also features Anil Kapoor, Sharmila Tagore and Neeraj Vora with Rani Mukerji in a special appearance. This is the second collaboration between Khan and Koirala since Akele Hum Akele Tum, the film is majorly based on the 1957 American film An Affair To Remember. Mann received positive reviews upon release, but became an average grosser at the box office. The soundtrack by Sanjeev–Darshan has been surrounded by music sampling and music plagiarism controversies.

Plot 
Dev Karan Singh (Aamir Khan), a Casanova and ambitious painter deep in debt, agrees to marry Anita (Deepti Bhatnagar), the daughter of Singhania (Dalip Tahil), a rich tycoon. Priya (Manisha Koirala), a music teacher for children, is engaged to Raj (Anil Kapoor), whom she has agreed to marry because he had helped her when she was in need. Priya and Dev meet on a cruise. Dev becomes fond of Priya. Dev is a fun-loving, flamboyant cassanova. He tries to get close to Priya. Initially, she doesn't get impressed by Dev, but later falls in love with him. However, due to them already being engaged to other people, they agree to work everything out and meet in 6 months on Valentine's Day to get married.

During the 6 months, Dev breaks off his engagement with Anita and starts working hard. Driven by his love, he creates and auctions beautiful paintings, and becomes very successful along with the support of his friend Natu (Neeraj Vora). On the other hand, Priya realises that leaving Raj will be wrong and sadly writes a letter to Dev, explaining everything. When Raj gets the letter instead, he supports Priya and convinces her to go to Dev. Things take a bad turn when, on her way to meet him, Priya gets hit by a car and gets her legs amputated. Dev, who waited all night for Priya, believes she has rejected him, as he does not know of her accident. Priya forbids Raj from telling Dev the truth, not wanting to become a burden on him. Now, Priya spends her time running a musical academy for small kids.

Though heartbroken, Dev continues his career and goes on to become a famous painter. One day, Priya attends his art exhibition and wishes to buy a painting of his, a sentimental picture of her speaking to his beloved grandmother, whom Dev had introduced to her during the cruise. Dev had said that he would not sell the painting as it was only for Priya, but upon hearing that the girl who wanted it understands the emotion behind the picture and is disabled, he tells the host of the exhibition to give the painting to her for free.

One day, he meets Priya again with Raj at a theatre gathering but again Priya forbids Raj of telling the truth. He visits Priya to give her an anklet that his grandmother, who recently died, had wished for Priya to have when she became Dev's bride. Initially unaware of Priya's condition, Dev realises the truth when he remembers giving the painting to a disabled girl and finds the same painting in another room. The two embrace tearfully and he assures Priya that he will love her no matter what. Dev and Priya then married by Raj, where Dev carries Priya for the wedding rounds in the presence of Nattu and the children of the Musical academy.

Cast 
Aamir Khan as Dev Karan Singh
Manisha Koirala as Priya Verma 
Anil Kapoor as Raj
Sharmila Tagore as Suhana Devi Singh, Dev's grandmother.
Deepti Bhatnagar as Anita Singhania, Pratap's daughter. (special appearance)
Dalip Tahil as Pratap Rai Singhania, Anita's father. (special appearance)
Shama Sikander as Kamini
Neeraj Vora as Nattu
Satyen Kappu as Raj's uncle
Anant Mahadevan as Creditor
Mushtaq Khan as TV Reporter
Paresh Ganatra as Popatlal,as passenger in ship.
Sheela Sharma as Miss Lovelina, as passenger in ship.
Pappu Polyester as passenger in ship.
Sanjay Goradia as Passenger in ship.
Ketki Dave as Madhu, Priya's friend. (special appearance)
Sumona Chakravarti as Neha child actor in s
Rani Mukerji as Dncer in song Kali Nagin Ke Jaisi. (special appearance)
Kapil Jhaveri

Soundtrack 
The soundtrack was composed by the duo Sanjeev–Darshan, while the lyrics were by Sameer Anjaan. Most of the tracks were allegedly plagiarised from other artists' songs without crediting them. "Nasha Yeh Pyar Ka" is based on the melody of "L'Italiano" by the Italian singer Toto Cutugno, "Tinak Tin Tana" is lifted from "Yang Sedang Sedang Saja" by the Malaysian singer Iwan, "Chaha Hai Tujhko" is based on the Tamil song "Edho Oru Paatu" composed by S. A. Rajkumar from Unnidathil Ennai Koduthen (1998), "Khushiyan Aur Gham" was lifted from "Come Vorrei" by the Italian pop group Ricchi e Poveri, and "Kali Nagin Ke Jaisi" was lifted from "Ya Rayah" by the Algerian singer Dahmane El Harrachi. The first 40 seconds of "Kehna Hai Tumse" were lifted from "Liquid" by Jars of Clay, but the rest of the song is original.

References

External links 
 

1990s Hindi-language films
1999 films
1999 romantic drama films
Films directed by Indra Kumar
Films distributed by Yash Raj Films
Films scored by Sanjeev Darshan
Films shot in Switzerland
Remakes of Indian films
Indian remakes of American films
Indian romantic drama films
Plagiarism controversies
Sampling controversies
Works involved in plagiarism controversies